Andrae Campbell (born 14 March 1989) is a Jamaican international footballer who plays as a defender. When he plays outdoors, Campbell primarily plays as a left-back.

Career
Campbell has played club football for Portmore United and Waterhouse.

In 2012, Campbell signed with Notodden FK in Norway. On 28 March 2014 left Norway to sign with American USL Professional League side Wilmington Hammerheads FC. Campbell is one of three Jamaican, alongside Jason Watson and Ashani Fairclough who signed during the 2014 winter transfer window.

In November 2016, Campbell signed with the Ottawa Fury for the 2017 season. He left the club in November 2017

International career
Campbell represented Jamaica at the U20 level in 2009.
In August 2011, he was a member of the under-23 national team competing in Olympic qualifying. He made his senior international debut for Jamaica in 2008.

References

1989 births
Living people
Jamaican footballers
Jamaica international footballers
Portmore United F.C. players
Waterhouse F.C. players
Notodden FK players
Wilmington Hammerheads FC players
Orange County SC players
Ottawa Fury FC players
Jamaican expatriate footballers
Jamaican expatriate sportspeople in Norway
Expatriate footballers in Norway
Expatriate soccer players in the United States
Jamaican expatriate sportspeople in the United States
Expatriate soccer players in Canada
Jamaican expatriate sportspeople in Canada
2009 CONCACAF U-20 Championship players
Association football fullbacks
Major Arena Soccer League players
Ontario Fury players
People from Saint Catherine Parish
Pan American Games silver medalists for Jamaica
Pan American Games medalists in football
Medalists at the 2007 Pan American Games
Footballers at the 2007 Pan American Games